Andrew Guigues VI (1184 – 14 March 1237), known as André de Bourgogne, Dauphin of Viennois, was the Count of Albon, Briançon, Grenoble, and Oisans from 1228 until his death. He was the son of Hugh III of Burgundy and Béatrice of Albon. He took his regnal name after and inherited the titles and lands of his maternal grandfather, Guigues V.

During his reign he was a generous patron of monasteries and he expanded his territory by diplomacy rather than war. He founded the collegiate church Saint-André of Grenoble, which is today the last existing monument built by the delphinal dynasty, and where he and some of his successors were buried.

In 1228, Guigues was supporting Turin in their attempts to trade without paying heavy duties to Thomas, Count of Savoy.  This was despite the treaty that had been made between the families when Guigues's sister, Marguerite married the count's son and heir.

Marriages
In 1202 he married Beatrice (1182 – before 1248), Countess of Gap and Embrun, daughter of Rainon I of Sabran. They had:
Beatrice (born 1205) married Amaury de Montfort  

In 1215 Guigues divorced Beatrice and on 15 November 1219 married Beatrice, daughter of William VI of Montferrat. She was the domna (lady) of the troubadour Gauseran de Saint Leidier. 
She bore Guigues two sons: 
Guigues VII (1225–1269)
John (1227–1239)

References

Sources

1184 births
1237 deaths
12th-century French people
13th-century peers of France
Dauphins of Viennois
Counts of Albon
Counts of Grenoble
Counts of Oisans
Counts of Briançon
Counts of Embrun
Counts of Gap
House of Burgundy